William Henry Bean (1843 – date of death unknown) was a prominent South Australian businessman and parliamentarian. He was elected to the Sixth Parliament (paired with Henry Strangways) for the District of West Torrens of the South Australian House of Assembly, on 28 March 1870, until 23 November 1871, losing his seat after the dissolution of 1871. but was re-elected, with William James Magarey, to the Ninth Parliament (1878–1881) from 2 April 1878 to 19 March 1881, and re-elected, with Frederick Estcourt Bucknall, to the Tenth Parliament from 8 April 1881 to 19 March 1884. His brother George had held the seat previously and lost it under controversial circumstances. This is one of very few cases in Australia of a pair of brothers being parliamentarians). He campaigned again in 1878 for the West Torrens seat which he narrowly won, and retained it in 1881. He did not contest the 1884 elections.

He conducted the Adelaide affairs of Bean Brothers while George was overseas from 1869 to 1878. He also organised a large number of wool, hide, meat and bark shipments in partnership with H. J. Wilke.

He was appointed Justice of the Peace in 1872 but resigned in 1874.

W. H. Bean (with Wilke) bought into a gold discovery "Golding's Find" at Mount Torrens in 1870. and was a director in James Scott's "El Dorado" Mount Pleasant mine in 1872.

He was on the board of the South Australian Zoological and Acclimatization Society. He resigned or was dropped in 1884.

In 1884 Bean Brothers Limited successfully sued him in the Supreme Court for making unauthorised payments. He was declared insolvent in 1885.

He was in London at the time of his brother George's death in 1912.

References

1843 births
Year of death missing
Members of the South Australian House of Assembly